Joseph Henri François Van Lerius (23 December 1823, Antwerp – 29 February 1876, Mechelen) was a Belgian painter in the Romantic-Historical style.

Life 
Van Lerius was born in Boom, Antwerp, on 23 November 1823. In 1838, he was already an apprentice draftsman at the Académie Royale des Beaux-Arts in Brussels. From 1839 to 1844, he was a student of Gustave Wappers. He took a study trip through Germany and Italy in 1852. Two years later, he was appointed to a position as a painting instructor at the Royal Academy of Fine Arts (Antwerp). His notable students included Lawrence Alma-Tadema, Aloïs Boudry, Gerard Portielje, Henri Van Dyck and Piet Verhaert.

In 1861, he was awarded the Knight's Cross of the Order of Leopold and in 1869 became a Knight in the Order of St.Michael.

In 1875, he was diagnosed with meningitis. The following year, he died in Mechelen, where he had gone for treatment.

Work 
Van Lerius painted mythological and biblical scenes as well as portraits and genre pictures. Much of his work is didactic in nature.

In 1852 Queen Victoria bought his painting "Premier Né" (First Born), depicting a young couple with a baby. It is still on display at Windsor Castle. Perhaps his best-known work is "Lady Godiva", which was shown at the Antwerp Triennial Salon in 1870. It was purchased by London art dealer Henry Graves. Other paintings found their way to San Francisco and St.Petersburg. For many years, he had an agent in New York. Many of his works (especially "Lady Godiva" and "Cinderella") have been widely reproduced.

References

Sources
 Biographie Nationale de Belgique, Vol.IX.
 A. Brokken, I. Machielsen and B. Fornari, Femme fatale tussen liefde & dood (exhibition catalog), Sint-Niklaas, 1992.

See also 
Felix Moscheles

External links

More works by Van Lerius @ ArtNet

1823 births
1876 deaths
Belgian portrait painters
19th-century Belgian painters
19th-century Belgian male artists
Artists from Antwerp
People from Boom, Belgium